C. tumescens may refer to:

Chonetes tumescens, an extinct species of brachiopod.
Chorigyne tumescens, a species of plant.
Chrysogaster tumescens, a species of hoverflies.
Clypeaster humilis (synonym Clypeaster tumescens), a species of sea urchin.
Corymbia tumescens, a species of tree.
Cymbella tumescens, a species of diatom.
Cymus tumescens, a species of true bug.
Terrabacter tumescens (formerly Corynebacterium tumescens), a Gram-positive bacterium.